Thouron is a commune in the Haute-Vienne department in the Nouvelle-Aquitaine region in west-central France.

See also
 Communes of the Haute-Vienne department

References

Communes of Haute-Vienne